The 24th Annual South African Music Awards was held at Sun City, in the North West on June 2, 2018. The list of nominees was announced on April 19, 2018 at Birchwood Hotel in Ekurhuleni. Mafikizolo, Mi Casa and Shekhinah each received a node of nomination Other artists with multiple nominations include Mobi Dixon, Distruction Boyz and Riky Rick. It was aired live on SABC 1 at 20:00 CAT. The show was hosted by Somizi Mhlongo, Dineo Ranaka and Mpho Popps.

Shekhinah garnered the most awards with four while Mafikizolo came closest by claiming three awards. Steve Kekana, Mbongeni Ngema and Spoke H received the Lifetime Achievement Award in recognition of their career spanning over decades.

Winners and nominees
Winners are listed in bold.

Album of the Year
Rose Gold – Shekhinah
The Beautiful Madness – Tresor
20 – Mafikizolo
King Zamar – Lady Zamar
Yellow – Shane Eagle

Duo or Group of the Year
Mafikizolo – MafikizoloSofa Silahlane – Team Mosha
Late Night People – Goldfish
Familia – Mi Casa
If You Don't You Never Will – Prime Circle

Female Artist of the YearRose Gold – ShekhinahKing Zamar – Lady Zamar
Simphiwe Dana Symphony Experience – Simphiwe Dana
Highly Flavoured – Busiswa
Siphokazi – Siphokazi

Male Artist of the yearI Am Music – Prince KaybeeBeautiful Madness – Tresor
Relationships – Afrotraction
Manando – Emtee
Ikhambi – Ndunduzo Makhathini

Newcomer of the YearRose Gold – ShekhinahYellow – Shane Eagle
The New Era Session – Rouge
Blaq Diamond – Blaq Diamond
Songs About You – Thabsie

Best Rock AlbumSelfmedikasie - FokofpolisiekarIf You Don't You Never Will – Prime Circle
Snakes & Ladders – Lost & Found
Blitzkriek – Willim Welsyn
TMK – Shortstraw

Best Pop AlbumThe Beautiful Madness – TresorBarely Breathing – Connell Cruise
Monark Monark – Tresor The Beautiful Madness
Restless – Craig Lucas

Beste Pop Album Die Danslover Brand – Kurt Darren LaatSing Vir Liefde – Karlien Van Jaarsveld
Hy Loop Oop – Brendan Peyper
Uitbasuin – Ray Dylan
Iemand Om Lief Te H – Lianie May

Best Adult Contemporary AlbumSymphonic Soweto – Wouter KellermanNow Listen Properly – Swing City
Indie Soul – Josie Field
Life's Journey – Charlie Finch
Miscellany – Janie Bay

Beste Kontemporêre Musiek AlbumSkepe – Joe BlackFantasies Okay! – Die Heuwels
Van Die Toorbos – Saarkie Queen
Jupiter Korreltjie Kantel – Luna Paige, Nick Turner, Jamie
Jy En Ek En EK En Jy – Chris Chameleon

Best Traditional Music AlbumJessica Mbangeni Sings Igoli Live @Lyric Theatre Johannesburg – Jessica MbangeniUthando – Bombshell
The Beginning – Complete Isiqalo
Pitsi – Dinonyane Cultural Group
Camarata Indodana Symphony – University of Pretoria

Best Maskandi Album6 To 6 – Abafana BakaMgqumeniEmkhathini – Shwi Nomntekhala
Isixaxa Samaxoki – Khuzani
Miss South Africa – Uqhosha Ngokwenza Kwakhe
Wavuma – Mbuzeni

Best Jazz AlbumIkhamba – Nduduzo MakhathiniTribute Okestra Live At The Bird's Eye – The Blue Notes
Yellow The Novel – Zoe Modiga
Committee Voices Of Our Vision – Tune Recreation
The Simphiwe Dana Symphony Experience – Simphiwe Dana

Best R&B / Soul / Reggae AlbumRelationships – AfrotractionThe Greatest Hits – The Nameless Band
Songs About You – Thabsie
Busisiwe – Cici
Never Lost – Thami

Best Hip Hop AlbumYellow – Shane EagleThe New Era Session – Rouge
Stay Shining – Ricky Rick
Manando – Emtee
F2D Presents Hall Of Fame – Fresh 2 Def Productions

Best Kwaito AlbumHighly Flavoured – BusiswaSofa Silahlane – Team Mosha
Do more Squats – Chomee
Bona That Rural Dream – Mashabela Galane
Ska Ba Hemisa – Trendsetters

Best Dance AlbumKing Zamar – Lady ZamarHouse Grooves 10 – DJ Ganyani Ganyani's
Pure Black Album – DJ Merlon'
I Am Music – Prince KayBee
Familia – Mi Casa

Best Classical / Instrumental AlbumTrio Baroqueswing Vol III – Charl Du PlesisChilled – James Grace
Matimba Ya Vuyimbeleri – University of Limpopo Choristers and The Kwazulu-Natal Philharmonic Orchestra
Window To The Ashramt – Kinsmen
Insomnia – CH2

Best Traditional Faith AlbumAndile Kamajola - Andile KamajolaBeliever In Christ – Yala Nkosi
Bonke Abemethembayo – Futhi Shongwe
Soloko Intliziyo Yami – Amadodana AseWesile
BaMorena Ntjhafatso – Barorisi

Best African Indigenous AlbumSamson Aphi Amandla – Vuma ZionWonders of Mercy – Bongani Nchang
Victorious In His Presence With Benjamin Swazi The Alabaster – Benjamin Dube
Solid Rock – Sicelo Moya
Heaven's Ways – Nqubeko Mbatha

Best African Adult Contemporary AlbumILanga – Siseko PameTime II Time – Joe Nina
Based on a True Story – Serame Sediti
Siphokazi – Siphokazi
Tribute Birdie Mbowenu – Tribute Birdie Mbowenu

Best Alternative Music AlbumMangaliso – Bongeziwe MabandlaAfrika For Beginners – Jack Parow
Hierdie Is Die Lewe – Francois Van Coke
The Morning Show – Josh Kempen
Your Princess Is In Another Castle – Loui Lvndn

Best Live Audio Visual Recording/DVDRed Mic Experience – DonaldVictorious In His Presence With Benjamin – Benjamin Dube
The Simphiwe Dana Symphony Experience – Simphiwe Dana
The Parlotones Orchestrated – The Parlotones
Krone For Live – Krone

Music Video of The YearArumtumtum – RougeNaaa Mean – Nadia Nakai
Spirit (featuring Wale) – Kwesta
Don't Do It – Nasty C
Let It Flow – Shane Eagle

Best Engineered Album20 – MafikizoloFamila – Mi Casa
A Noise In The Void – Kahn
Makhathini Ikhambi – Nduduzo
Gqom Is The Future  – Distruction Boyz

Best African Artist AlbumThe Simphiwe Dana Symphony Experience – Simphiwe DanaSounds from the Other Side – Wizkid
Yellow The Novel – Zoë Modiga
This is Me – Niniola
M&M – Moreira Chonguica & Manu Dibango

Best CollaborationAkanamali (featuring Samthing Soweto) - Sun-El MusicianOmunye (featuring Benni Maverick & Dladla Mshunqisi) – Distruction Boyz
Spirit (featuring Wale) – Kwesta
Inde (featuring  Bucie & Nokwazi) – Heavy-K
Ngempela(featuring Howard & DJ Maphorisa) – Sjava

Remix of the YearI Got You – Mobi DixonFaith Alive – King Bayaa
Fres – Household Funk
Buy It Out (featuring YoungstaCPT, KLY, Da L.E.S, Frank Casino, J Molley & Stilo Magolide – Riky Rick)
Mwanangu  (featuring Jackie Queens) - Enoo Napa

Record of the year (Fan Voted)Omunye'' - Distruction BoyzSpirit (featuring Wale) - KwestaLove Is Blinde - Lady ZamarAkanamali (featuring Samthing Soweto) - Sun-EL MusicianCharlotte - Prince KaybeeI Do (featuring Amanda Black) - LaSauceLove Portion - MafikizoloMidnight Starring - DJ MaphorisaThe World Is Yours - AKAImali - Black MotionNgiyazifela Ngawe - KwestaSuited - ShekhinahLove Me In The Dark - Sketchy Bongo

Special Awards

International Achievement Award

Shakshika Mooruth

Lifetime Achievement Award

Steve Kekana
Spokes H
Mbongeni Ngema

Sales and Downloads Awards

Best Selling AlbumJoyous Celebration Volume 21 Heal Our Land - Joyous Celebration

Best Selling Digital ArtistJoyous Celebration Volume 21 Heal Our Land'' - Joyous Celebration

Sponsored Awards

Highest Radio Airplay of the Year (SAMPRA)

Akanamali (featuring Samthing Soweto) - Sun-EL Musician

Best Selling Digital Download Composers’ Award (CAPASSO)

Timothy Bambelela Myeni

Changes
In June 2018, the Sama Awards organization announced few changes to various categories namely Best Rap Album, Best African Adult, Best Africa Artist and The Best Kwaito Album.

Best Rap Album has changed to Best Hip Hop Album. The renaming allows for Hip Hop DJs to enter their albums in addition to Rap residing in this category.
Best African Adult has changed to Best African Adult Contemporary Album. The category does not carry language exclusion.
Best Africa Artist has changed to Best African Artist. This has also been made a special category so that South African artists can enter their works and compete for the bragging rights of being named the best artist in the African continent.

Controversy
In April 2018, The Recording Industry of South Africa (RiSA) announced that the artist Sands' entry for Record of the Year, "Tigi", had been struck off the nominees' list because Sands was a citizen of Eswatini. Mobi Dixon's nomination for Best Remix of the song, "Lake by the Ocean", had also been disqualified because it was a remix of an international song which was a contravention of the SAMA rules. "Tigi" by Sands was replaced by "Love Me in the Dark", by Sketchy Bongo on the nominations list. In the place of "Lake by the Ocean" by Mobi Dixon was the remixed song, which "Mwanangu" by Jackie Queens and VeneiGrette, remixed by Enoo Napa.

References

2019 in South Africa
South African music awards
2019 music awards